Cecilia Venier (died 1543) was suo jure lady of Paros in 1531-1537. She was the last ruler of Paros before it was conquered by the Ottoman Empire in 1537.

Life
Cecilia was the daughter of Fiorenza Sommaripa and Zuan Francesco Venier. After the death of her brother Nicolò in 1531, she claimed the island of Paros, against Crusino III Sommaripa and John IV Crispo. Until the dispute could be resolved, Venice administered the island. Her rights where acknowledged in 1535 after a trial in Venice, and she ruled jointly with her spouse, Bernado Sagredo. 

In 1537 Paros was conquered by the Ottoman Hayreddin Barbarossa. Cecilia and her spouse abandoned the fortress at Agousa and was besieged in the castle of Kephalos, were her spouse took command of the defense with the aid of a Florentine outlaw and resisted the Ottoman siege for several days. Sagredo was eventually forced to surrender because of the lack of gun powder. 

In the treaty of surrender, Cecilia Venier was deposed from her position and allowed to depart the island for refuge in Venice, while her spouse were held captive by the Ottomans, but was eventually released from captivity. The Ottoman conquest of Paros reportedly led to atrocities committed against the public, however: evidently, old men were killed, young men take as slaves to the galleys and young women to the harems. 

Cecilia Venier died six years after her deposition.

References

 Miller, William. The Latins in the Levant: A History of Frankish Greece (1204–1566). London: 1908.

Year of birth missing
1543 deaths
Medieval Cyclades
House of Venier
Lords of Paros
16th-century women rulers
16th-century Greek people
16th-century Greek women